These are the late night Monday-Friday schedules on all three networks for each calendar season beginning September 1960. All times are Eastern and Pacific.

Talk shows are highlighted in yellow, local programming is white.

Schedule

By network

NBC

Returning Series
The Jack Paar Show
The Best Of Paar

United States late night network television schedules
1960 in American television
1961 in American television